Carolyn Larabell is an American scientist, professor of Anatomy at the University of California, San Francisco and the Director of the National Center for X-ray Tomography. Her research focus on X-ray microtomography for life science and the imaging of cells.

Education 
Larabell received her MS in Zoology and her PhD in Cell Biology from Arizona State University in 1988.

Research and career 
She performed postdoctoral research in neurobiology at Stanford University and then in the department of Biochemistry and Biophysics at the University of California, Davis, where she began working with electron microscopy. 

In 1990, she joined the Lawrence Berkeley National Laboratory, where her research focus was on developing new imaging techniques for studying biological cells. She became the Advanced Light Source Professor at LBNL in 1999. A year later, she was appointed as a Professor in the Department of Anatomy at University of California, San Francisco.

Larabell is currently the director the National Center for X-ray Tomography (NCXT) at Lawrence Berkeley National Laboratory, which she established in 2004. The NCXT is home to the world's first soft x-ray microscope designed specifically for biomedical research.

Awards and honours 
Larabell received the David A. Shirley Award for Outstanding Scientific Achievement in 2017.

References 

Living people
American anatomists
Arizona State University alumni
Year of birth missing (living people)
Women anatomists
21st-century American scientists
21st-century American women scientists
Tomography
University of California, San Francisco faculty